Cuzzart is an unincorporated community in Preston County, West Virginia, United States. Cuzzart had a post office, which closed on April 16, 1994.

Cuzzart most likely derives its name from a local family.

References

Unincorporated communities in Preston County, West Virginia
Unincorporated communities in West Virginia